Richie Vitale (born September 23, 1954; Rochester, New York) is an American jazz trumpeter, arranger, and composer.

Performances

Vitale played trumpet in the 2010 Broadway show Come Fly Away with a 19-piece big band playing the music of Frank Sinatra and dancing of the Twyla Tharp Dance Troup. Vitale recorded his first album Vitalogy for Gut String Records. He has led a quintet on tours of Europe, Japan, Korea, the Middle East, San Francisco, and Los Angeles.

Teaching
Vitale has taught Clinics and Master Classes at the Eastman School of Music, instructed the Jazz Ensemble at Long Island University and was Brass Instructor at Manhattan School of Music and Long Island University and is currently teaching jazz trumpet and ensemble at New Jersey City University.

Big Band experience
Vitale was a trumpet soloist with Frank Sinatra for five years and has also performed with Tony Bennett, Buddy Rich, James Taylor and Sting. He was featured soloist with the Vanguard Orchestra, the Toshiko Akiyoshi Big Band, the Basie Band, and the Ellington Band.

Small group experience
Worked with Frank Wess, Jack Bruce and the Chris Byars Octet.

Discography
As leader
 1988 Dreamsville
 1996 Live at Smalls
 2000 Shake It!
 2005 New York Salsa
 2011 Vitalogy

As sideman
 1984 Vertical Currency
 1992 Duets 2, Frank Sinatra
 2006 The Evening Sound, Neil Minor Sextet
 2006 Night Owls, Chris Byars Octet

References

American jazz trumpeters
American male trumpeters
1954 births
Living people
21st-century trumpeters
21st-century American male musicians
American male jazz musicians